Ruth Mari Grung (born 10 March 1959) is a Norwegian politician for the Labour Party. She was elected member of the Storting from 2013 to 2021.

Personal life and education
Grung was born in Bergen on 10 March 1959, a daughter of programmer Bjørn Grung and schoolteacher Sigfrid Eriksen. A student at the University of Bergen from 1979 to 1984, she graduated in history and economy.

Political career
Grung was elected to the Parliament of Norway from Hordaland in 2013, where she was member of the Standing Committee on Health and Care Services from 2013 to 2017. She was re-elected to the Storting for the period 2017–2021, and was member of the Standing Committee on Business and Industry from 2017 to 2019, and of the Standing Committee on Energy and the Environment from 2019 to 2021.

References 

Labour Party (Norway) politicians
Members of the Storting
Hordaland politicians
1959 births
Living people
21st-century Norwegian politicians